The 1935 Centenary Gentlemen football team was an American football team that represented the Centenary College of Louisiana as a member of the Southern Intercollegiate Athletic Association during the 1935 college football season. In their second year under head coach Curtis Parker, the team compiled a 6–5 record.

Schedule

References

Centenary
Centenary Gentlemen football seasons
Centenary Gentlemen football